Walter Fyrst (né Fürst; 6 July 1901 – 23 February 1993) was a Norwegian filmmaker. He was born in Kristiania (now Oslo), the son of the physician Valentin Fürst and Margarethe Christiane Dedekam. His first film was Troll-elgen from 1927, based on two novels by Mikkjel Fønhus. Other films were Cafe X from 1928 and Brudekronen from 1944. Fyrst made propaganda films for the Nazi regime during the occupation of Norway by Nazi Germany.

Filmography
 1927: Troll-elgen
 1928: Cafe X
 1932: Prinsessen som ingen kunne målbinde
 1942: Vi er Vidkun Quislings hirdmenn
 1943: Unge viljer
 1944: Brudekronen
 1944: Villmarkens lov
 1955: Hjem går vi ikke

References

1901 births
1993 deaths
Film people from Oslo
Norwegian film directors
Members of Nasjonal Samling

People convicted of treason for Nazi Germany against Norway